Dendroplectron aucklandensis the Auckland Island wētā, is a cave wētā in the family Rhaphidophoridae, the only member of the genus Dendroplectron. It is endemic to the subantarctic Auckland Islands of New Zealand.

References 

 Peripatus

Ensifera genera
Fauna of the Auckland Islands
Cave weta
Monotypic Orthoptera genera